Purkinje is a name attributed to several biological features, so named for their discovery by Czech anatomist Jan Evangelista Purkyně:
Purkinje cells, located in the cerebellum
Purkinje fibers, located in the heart
The visual Purkinje effect of how human beings do not see color in dim light
Purkinje images, reflections of objects from the surface of the cornea, and from the anterior and posterior surfaces of the lens
Purkinje Incorporated, a company that develops healthcare information technology software and services